Patrycja Soliman (born 3 December 1981) is a Polish film and stage actress.

Biography 
She was born to an Egyptian father and a Polish mother.

In 2006 she graduated from the Aleksander Zelwerowicz State Theatre Academy in Warsaw. Patrycja Soliman debuted as an actress in 2002 in the movie Day of the wacko.

Filmography 
Movies
 2009: Play With Me as Hania
 2007: Louise's Garden as Luisa
 2007: The Boat as Agata
 2006: We're All Christs as journalist
 2006: Jasminum as Jasminum
 2005: Karol: A Man Who Became Pope as Wisława
 2002: Day of the wacko as girl

TV series
 2009: Barwy Szczęścia
 2008: Londoners
 2007: Królowie Śródmieścia
 2007: Ekipa
 2007: Kryminalni
 2006: M jak miłość
 2006: Królowie Śródmieścia
 2005: Boża podszewka II
 2004-2006: Pensjonat pod Różą
 2004: Na dobre i na złe
 2003: Glina

Awards 
 Best Supporting Actress at XXIV Festival of the Drama & Theatre Schools in Łódź, for Trzy siostry and Bezimienne dzieło (2006)
 Andrzej Naderlli Award for the best actors debut in the National Theatre in Warsaw (2007)

References

External links 
 
 Patrycja Soliman at Filmweb 

1981 births
Living people
Polish film actresses
Polish stage actresses
Polish television actresses
Egyptian people of Polish descent
Actresses from Cairo
Egyptian emigrants to Poland
21st-century Polish actresses